Ciecierze  is a village in the administrative district of Gmina Chmielnik, within Kielce County, Świętokrzyskie Voivodeship, in south-central Poland.

The village has a population of 80.

References

Ciecierze